Cele Abba (25 May 1906 – 1 January 1992) was an Italian actress, sister of actress Marta Abba. She was born in Milan, Italy.

Biography 
Her career experienced some reflected light, conditioned by the great popularity obtained by her older sister, the famous Marta, muse of Luigi Pirandello. Second daughter of the merchant Pompeo Abba and Giuseppina Trabucchi, she made her debut on the theater stage next to her sister who wanted her by her side for the 1927–1928 season in the Pirandelliana Company directed by the famous writer and playwright Luigi Pirandello.

In the 1929–1930 season, she had roles as the second woman in the Za-Bum Theater Company directed by Mario Mattoli and in the following one, 1930–1931, she performed in company with Renzo Ricci, Irma Gramatica and Luigi Carini. In the summer of 1931, she performed in the theatrical staging of Campo di Maggio, written and directed by Giovacchino Forzano. In the 1932–1933 season she acted with Ruggero Ruggeri and then in the summer of 1933 she was Ippolita in the cast of Shakespeare's A Midsummer Night's Dream directed by Max Reinhardt with Carlo Lombardi, Giovanni Cimara, Nerio Bernardi, Rina Morelli, Sarah Ferrati, Cesare Bettarini, Armando Migliari, Ruggero Lupi, Luigi Almirante, Giuseppe Pierozzi, Memo Benassi, Evi Maltagliati and Eva Magni represented at the Boboli Gardens in Florence. In the 1933–1934 season she played leading actress roles in Aristide Baghetti's company. He lived for several years in Sanremo, until 1960, when he returned to settle permanently in his hometown, Milan.

Selected filmography
 The Haller Case (1933)
 Passaporto rosso (1935)

References

External links

Italian film actresses
1906 births
1992 deaths
20th-century Italian actresses
Actresses from Milan